Rachel Akosua Funmilola Garton (born 20 January 1991), professionally known as Lola Rae, is a Nigerian singer. She gained recognition following the release of her debut single "Watch My Ting Go", which received critical acclaim and thus earned her a nomination for the Most Promising Female Act to Watch at the 2013 Nigeria Entertainment Awards.

Growing up and education 
Lola Rae was born to a British father and a Ghanaian mother in Obalende, a suburb of Lagos, Nigeria. She attained her primary and secondary school education at St. Saviour's School, Ikoyi; and Lekki British International High School, Lagos, respectively. She however, left Nigeria for England at the age of 15 to complete her university education at Central Saint Martins, where she studied fashion textiles.

Career 
Lola Rae's entertainment career started as a dancer when she was a member of a dancing group "Mystikal" in 2010.  Mystikal dancing group auditioned for Britain's Got Talent  where Rae sang in the competition and judge Simon Cowell singled Mystikal dancing group out at the semi-final of the competition. At the end of the competition, the group (Mystikal) was signed to Syco for a year. Rae turned down an invitation to The X Factor in order to pursue a solo career as a singer.

On 19 November 2012, Rae released her debut hit single Watch My Ting Go and a follow up single titled High. She was nominated as the "Most Promising Female Act to Watch" at the 2013 Nigeria Entertainment Awards. Her video on "Watch My Ting Go" premiered on Soundcity TV on 8 January 2013 with cameo appearances from Iyanya and Emma Nyra. The video was nominated at the 10th Channel O Music Video Awards.

Following the "Watch My Ting Go", Rae featured Iyanya on a song titled Fi Mi Le which earned her another nomination at the 2014 Nigeria Entertainment Awards. She made a cameo appearance as Ice Prince's love interest in the music video for his song "More".

Personal life 
In May 2018, Rae gave birth to a daughter with partner Tekno.

Discography

Singles 
As lead artist

As featured artist

Promotional singles

Awards and nominations

References 

1991 births
Living people
21st-century Nigerian women singers
Nigerian female dancers
Nigerian people of British descent
Nigerian people of Ghanaian descent
English-language singers from Nigeria
Yoruba-language singers
Singers from Lagos